Claire Beaulieu (born 1955) is a Canadian artist. She works in the fields of painting, sculpture, installation and drawing.

Early life
Beaulieu was born in 1955 in Arvida, Quebec, and now lives and works in Montreal.  She earned both her fine arts degrees from the Université du Québec à Montréal, completing her Master's of Fine Arts in 1990.

Career
From 1991 until 1994, she was a professor at Université du Québec à Hull. Starting in 1996, she became a professor at Cégep du Vieux Montréal. Prior to that, she also taught at Cégep André-Laurendeau and the Université de Montréal.

Her work is included in the collection of the Musée national des beaux-arts du Québec,

Further reading
Le Grand, Jean-Pierre. "Claire Beaulieu et Lisette Lemieux." Espace Art actuel, number 29, Autumn 1994, p. 26–28.

References

External links

1955 births
21st-century Canadian painters
21st-century Canadian photographers
21st-century Canadian women artists
Artists from Quebec
Canadian installation artists
Canadian women painters
Living people
People from Saguenay, Quebec
Université du Québec à Montréal alumni